Mauricio Alejandro Gómez Rios (born March 5, 1989) is a Chilean former footballer who played as a striker.

Club career
Gómez nickname is "Hormona" because on his youth squads he was usually taller than his teammates. He came through the youth system of Universidad de Chile, being the top scorer at most levels. His professional debut came in the 2006 Clausura tournament against Cobreloa, in which he scored.  Since his debut he has not seen much playing time. He also received some criticism from Universidad de Chile's former coach Arturo Salah. For Apertura 2010 Tournament he will play for Universidad de Concepción of Chile, on loan for 1 year.

International career
Gómez represented Chile U20 in the 2009 South American Championship, scoring 3 goals. In addition, he took part of the Chile U21 squad that won the 2009 Toulon Tournament.

Honours

Club
Universidad de Chile
Primera División de Chile (1): 2009 Apertura

Deportes Temuco
Primera B (1): 2015–16

International
Chile U21
Toulon Tournament (1): 2009

References

External links
 
 
 

1989 births
Living people
Chilean footballers
Chilean expatriate footballers
Chile under-20 international footballers
Chile youth international footballers
People from Bío Bío Province
Universidad de Chile footballers
Universidad de Concepción footballers
Santiago Morning footballers
Rangers de Talca footballers
Ñublense footballers
Deportes Temuco footballers
Universitario de Sucre footballers
Deportes Iberia footballers
Santiago Wanderers footballers
Deportes Recoleta footballers
Chilean Primera División players
Segunda División Profesional de Chile players
Primera B de Chile players
Bolivian Primera División players
Chilean expatriate sportspeople in Bolivia
Expatriate footballers in Bolivia
Association football forwards